"De troubadour" ("The troubadour"), sung in Dutch by Lenny Kuhr representing the , was – together with "Boom Bang-a-Bang", "Un jour, un enfant", and "Vivo cantando" from, respectively, the , , and  – one of the four winners of the Eurovision Song Contest 1969.

In a ballad inspired both musically and lyrically by folk-song traditions, Kuhr sings about a troubadour of the Middle Ages, describing the impact the music has on his audiences. Kuhr also recorded the song in English (as "The Troubadour"), French ("Le troubadour"), German ("Der Troubadour"), Italian ("Un cantastorie") and Spanish ("El trovador"). The 1969 Contest was controversially held in Madrid, Spain during Francisco Franco's dictatorship; 5 years after the Contest, Kuhr also recorded the song with revised Dutch lyrics, then retitled "De generaal" ("The general"), which was a homage to the Dutch national soccer coach Rinus Michels, who was nicknamed so by the players of the Dutch team.

The song was performed eighth on the night, following the United Kingdom's Lulu with "Boom Bang-a-Bang" and preceding 's Tommy Körberg with "Judy, min vän". By the close of voting, it had received 18 points, placing it equal first in a field of 16. The Netherlands thus achieved the rare feat of going from (equal) last to (equal) first in the space of one year.

External links
 Official Eurovision Song Contest site, history by year, 1969
 Detailed info and lyrics, Diggiloo Thrush, "De troubadour"

Songs about musicians
Eurovision songs of the Netherlands
Eurovision songs of 1969
Eurovision Song Contest winning songs
Philips Records singles
1969 songs